Amaxia pandama is a moth of the family Erebidae. It was described by Herbert Druce in 1893. It is found in Ecuador, Bolivia, Suriname and the Brazilian state of Amazonas.

References

Moths described in 1893
Amaxia
Moths of South America